ReMastered: Devil at the Crossroads is a 2019 documentary film about Robert Johnson, the blues singer, songwriter and musician. It was released on April 26, 2019 on Netflix streaming.

Premise
The documentary takes a look at the short, mysterious life of Robert Johnson, the blues singer, songwriter and musician who has influenced later generations of musicians. The documentary title comes from the myth about how he made a deal with the Devil at a crossroads in rural Mississippi to achieve musical success.

Cast

References

External links

 
 
 

2019 documentary films
2019 films
Netflix original documentary films
2010s English-language films